Dimitrios Koutromanos (born 25 February 1987) is a Greek professional footballer who plays as a right back for Super League 2 club Anagennisi Karditsa, for which he is captain.

Honours 
AEK Athens
Greek Cup: Runners-up 2008–09

References
 Guardian Football
 

Living people
1987 births
Greek footballers
Greece youth international footballers
AEK Athens F.C. players
Panetolikos F.C. players
PAS Lamia 1964 players
Thrasyvoulos F.C. players
Anagennisi Karditsa F.C. players
Ethnikos Piraeus F.C. players
Association football fullbacks
Footballers from Agrinio